Lobopterella is a genus of cockroaches in the family Ectobiidae.

Taxonomy
Lobopterella contains the following species:
 Lobopterella pallipes
 Lobopterella princisi
 Lobopterella dimidiatipes

References

Cockroach genera